Attila Szabó may refer to:

Attila Szabó (athlete) (born 1984), Hungarian decathlete
Attila Szabó (Hungarian canoeist) (born 1963), Hungarian sprint canoer
Attila Szabó (Slovak canoeist) (born 1966), Czechoslovak-Slovak sprint canoer
Attila Henrik Szabó (born 1970), Hungarian writer and journalist
Attila Szabo (scientist), Hungarian-American biophysicist